Luke William Barker (born March 11, 1992) is an American professional baseball pitcher who is a free agent. He played for the Milwaukee Brewers of Major League Baseball in 2022.

Amateur career
Barker grew up in Chico, California and attended Pleasant Valley High School. He then attended California State University, Chico and played college baseball for the Chico State Wildcats for four seasons. Barker was named first team All-California Collegiate Athletic Association (CCAA) and first team Division II All-American after setting a school record with 18 saves as a junior and repeated as an All-CCAA selection after going 4–3 with a 1.73 ERA in 11 starts as a senior.

Professional career

Traverse City Beach Bums
Unselected in the 2015 Major League Baseball draft, Barker signed with the Traverse City Beach Bums of the independent Frontier League.

Milwaukee Brewers
He was signed by the Milwaukee Brewers on November 28, 2016. In 2017, Barker was assigned to Single-A Wisconsin Timber Rattlers before earning a promotion to the High-A Carolina Mudcats. He returned to Carolina for the 2018 season and was named the Carolina League Relief Pitcher of the Year after going 6–4 with 20 saves and a 2.21 ERA. Barker was assigned to the Double-A Biloxi Shuckers to begin the 2019 season, where he posted a 1.48 ERA over 23 appearances and was named a Southern League All-Star before being promoted to the Triple-A San Antonio Missions. Barker returned to Triple-A with the Nashville Sounds for the 2021 season. He was assigned to Nashville to begin the 2022 season.

On May 30, 2022, Barker was selected to the 40-man roster and promoted to the major leagues for the first time. On June 1, Barker was optioned back down to Nashville without making an appearance for the Brewers, giving him the distinction of being a phantom ballplayer. On June 3, Barker was recalled to the active roster. Barker made his major league debut with the Brewers the same day. He made 3 total appearances for Milwaukee in 2022, struggling to an 11.25 ERA, but maintaining a neat 5-0 record and 3.60 ERA across 23 appearances for the Triple-A Nashville Sounds.

On July 22, 2022, Barker was diagnosed with a sprained ulnar collateral ligament in his right elbow. The Brewers designated Barker for assignment on August 2. On August 5, he announced that he had undergone Tommy John surgery and would miss the remainder of the season. He was released by Milwaukee the same day.

References

External links

Chico State Wildcats bio

Living people
1992 births
Baseball players from California
Biloxi Shuckers players
Carolina Mudcats players
Chico State Wildcats baseball players
Gigantes del Cibao players
Major League Baseball pitchers
Milwaukee Brewers players
Nashville Sounds players
San Antonio Missions players
Sportspeople from Chico, California
Traverse City Beach Bums players
Wisconsin Timber Rattlers players
Alaska Goldpanners of Fairbanks players